John Blackwood may refer to:
 John Blackwood (publisher) (1818–1879), Scottish publisher
 Sir John Blackwood, 2nd Baronet (1722–1799), Irish politician and baronet
 Jock Blackwood (1899–c. 1970), Australian rugby union player
 John Blackwood (merchant) (before 1777–1819), Canadian merchant
 John Blackwood (footballer, born 1877) (1877–1913), Scottish footballer
 John Blackwood (footballer, born 1935), Scottish footballer
 Johnny Blackwood, fictional character in Act of Love
 John Blackwood (art dealer) (1696–1777), Scottish art dealer
 John Arthur Blackwood (1904–1973), British Hong Kong businessman
 John Blackwood, 11th Baron Dufferin and Claneboye, Australian architect

See also